Licavoli is a surname. Notable people with the surname include:

James T. Licavoli (1904-1985), American mobster
Peter Licavoli (1902-1984), American organized crime figure
Thomas Licavoli (1904-1973), American gangster and bootlegger